The League of Gentlemen Are Behind You! is a pantomime-themed stage show by The League of Gentlemen. It was their second major UK tour; it premiered in 2005. The whimsical, pantomime nature of the show was a departure from their trademark dark humour. Almost all the material performed was new and original.

A performance filmed at the Hammersmith Apollo, Hammersmith, was released on DVD Video.

References

External links
 

Comedy plays
Are B
Theatre in England
2005 plays